Mondolo is a surname. Notable people with the surname include:

Marco Modolo (born 1989), Italian footballer 
Sacha Modolo (born 1987), Italian road racing cyclist